We Are The Night is a South Korean indie rock band that debuted in 2013. The group consists of members Ham Byeong-seon (vocals), Jeong Won-jung (guitar), Hwang Seong-su (bass), and Kim Bo-ram (drums). The group has released two studio albums, We Are The Night (2013), and Vertigo (2019), as well as three EPS, Star, Fire, Night and Such Things (2015), The Green Ray (2016), and Calm Myself Down (2017).

Discography

Studio albums

Extended plays

Awards and nominations

References

External links 
 

South Korean indie rock groups
Musical groups established in 2013
2013 establishments in South Korea